Eogystia is a genus of moths in the family Cossidae.

Species
Eogystia hippophaecolus (Hua, Chou, Fang & Chen, 1990)
Eogystia kaszabi (Daniel, 1965)
Eogystia sibirica (Alphéraky, 1895)

Etymology
The genus name is derived from Greek eos (meaning eastern) and gystia, an anagram of the genus name Stygia.

References

, 1990: A Phylogenetic study on Cossidae (Lepidoptera: Ditrysia) based on external adult morphology. Zoologische Verhandelingen 263: 1-295. Full article: .

External links
Natural History Museum Lepidoptera generic names catalog

Cossinae
Moth genera